Nikola Mektić and Mate Pavić defeated Dan Evans and Neal Skupski in the final, 6–4, 6–4, to win the men's doubles tennis title at the 2021 Miami Open. The second-seeded duo did not drop a set en route to the title and became the first all-Croatian team to win the Miami Open. Pavić also usurped Robert Farah for the ATP No. 1 doubles ranking by winning the title after Farah lost in the second round.

Bob and Mike Bryan were the defending champions from when the tournament was last held in 2019, but they retired from professional tennis in August 2020.

Seeds

Draw

Finals

Top half

Bottom half

References

External links
 Main draw

Men's Doubles